Charles Raphael de Almeida (born April 10, 1995 in Rio de Janeiro), commonly known as Charles, is a Brazilian footballer. He currently plays for São Caetano.

Honours

Remo
Campeonato Paraense runner-up: 2020
Campeonato Brasileiro Série C runner-up: 2020

References

External links
 Charles at playmakerstats.com (English version of ogol.com.br)
 

1995 births
Living people
Macaé Esporte Futebol Clube players
Santa Cruz Futebol Clube players
Londrina Esporte Clube players
Clube do Remo players
Association football midfielders
Footballers from Rio de Janeiro (city)
Brazilian footballers